Mahir Koç more commonly known under his nickname Celal Başkale was a Kurdish commander of the Kurdistan Workers' Party, a militant organization that has been fighting the government of Turkey for autonomy for Kurdish people, since 1984. It is recognized as a terrorist organisation by Turkey, the United States and the European Union.

Başkale started out as a bodyguard for Fehman Hûseyn (Bahoz Erdal), who is the head of the Hezen Parastina Gel (HPG), the PKK's armed wing and later rose to become the commander of all PKK operations in the Black Sea Region.

On December 7, 2009, he led seven PKK guerrillas in an ambush against 15 Turkish commandos known as the Reşadiye shooting or Tokat assault. Seven of the commandos were killed and three were injured.

On April 11, 2012, two Turkish soldiers were killed in a PKK ambush near Çiğdemlik. In response the Turkish military started a large-scale operation against the PKK throughout Amasya Province. Celal Başkale was killed by Turkish forces along with another PKK militant on April 14.

References

External links
Picture of Celal Başkale

2012 deaths
Turkish Kurdish politicians
Kurdish military personnel killed in action
Members of the Kurdistan Workers' Party
Apoists
Year of birth missing
Kurdish nationalists